Maintenance of an organism is the collection of processes to stay alive, excluding production processes. The Dynamic Energy Budget theory delineates two classes
 Somatic maintenance mainly comprises the turnover of structural mass (mainly proteins) and the maintenance of concentration gradients of metabolites across membranes (e.g., counteracting leakage). This is related to maintenance respiration.
 Maturity maintenance concerns the maintenance of defence systems (such as the immune system), and the preparation of the body for reproduction.

The theory assumes that maturity maintenance costs can be reduced more easily during starvation than somatic maintenance costs. Under extreme starvation conditions, somatic maintenance costs are paid from structural mass, which causes shrinking. Some organism manage to switch to the torpor state under starvation conditions, and reduce their maintenance costs.

Developmental biology